Yongledian Town is a town in southeastern Tongzhou District,Beijing, China. It borders Huoxian Town in the north, Gaocun Town in the east, Nanjianta Town in the south, Caiyu Town and Yujiawu Hui Township in the west. The population of Yongledian was 43,308 as of 2020.

The town was named in honor of Yongle Emperor of Ming dynasty in 1403.

History

Administration divisions 
As of 2021, Yongledian Town was divided into 38 villages:

Economics 
In 2018, the town had a tax revenue of 905 million yuan, a 22.7% increase from last year.

See also 

 List of township-level divisions of Beijing

References 

Towns in Beijing
Tongzhou District, Beijing